Vocha is a former municipality in Corinthia, Peloponnese, Greece. Since the 2011 local government reform it is part of the municipality Velo-Vocha, of which it is a municipal unit. The municipal unit has an area of 87.895 km2. Population 10,966 (2011). The seat of the municipality was in Zevgolateio.

External links
Official website (in Greek)

References

Populated places in Corinthia